Overexploitation, also called overharvesting, refers to harvesting a renewable resource to the point of diminishing returns. Continued overexploitation can lead to the destruction of the resource, as it will be unable to replenish. The term applies to natural resources such as water aquifers, grazing pastures and  forests, wild medicinal plants, fish stocks and other wildlife.

In ecology, overexploitation describes one of the five main activities threatening global biodiversity. Ecologists use the term to describe populations that are harvested at an unsustainable rate, given their natural rates of mortality and capacities for reproduction. This can result in extinction at the population level and even extinction of whole species. In conservation biology, the term is usually used in the context of human economic activity that involves the taking of biological resources, or organisms, in larger numbers than their populations can withstand. The term is also used and defined somewhat differently in fisheries, hydrology and natural resource management.

Overexploitation can lead to resource destruction, including extinctions. However, it is also possible for overexploitation to be sustainable, as discussed below in the section on fisheries. In the context of fishing, the term overfishing can be used instead of overexploitation, as can overgrazing in stock management, overlogging in forest management, overdrafting in aquifer management, and endangered species in species monitoring. Overexploitation is not an activity limited to humans. Introduced predators and herbivores, for example, can overexploit native flora and fauna.

History 

Concern about overexploitation is relatively recent, though overexploitation itself is not a new phenomenon. It has been observed for millennia. For example, ceremonial cloaks worn by the Hawaiian kings were made from the mamo bird; a single cloak used the feathers of 70,000 birds of this now-extinct species. The dodo, a flightless bird from Mauritius, is another well-known example of overexploitation. As with many island species, it was naive about certain predators, allowing humans to approach and kill it with ease.

From the earliest of times, hunting has been an important human activity as a means of survival. There is a whole history of overexploitation in the form of overhunting. The overkill hypothesis (Quaternary extinction events) explains why the megafaunal extinctions occurred within a relatively short period. This can be traced to human migration. The most convincing evidence of this theory is that 80% of the North American large mammal species disappeared within 1000 years of the arrival of humans on the western hemisphere continents.  The fastest ever recorded extinction of megafauna occurred in New Zealand, where by 1500 AD, just 200 years after settling the islands, ten species of the giant moa birds were hunted to extinction by the Māori. A second wave of extinctions occurred later with European settlement.

In more recent times, overexploitation has resulted in the gradual emergence of the concepts of sustainability and sustainable development, which has built on other concepts, such as sustainable yield, eco-development, and deep ecology.

Overview 
Overexploitation does not necessarily lead to the destruction of the resource, nor is it necessarily unsustainable. However, depleting the numbers or amount of the resource can change its quality. For example, footstool palm is a wild palm tree found in Southeast Asia. Its leaves are used for thatching and food wrapping, and overharvesting has resulted in its leaf size becoming smaller.

Tragedy of the commons 

In 1968, the journal Science published an article by Garrett Hardin entitled "The Tragedy of the Commons". It was based on a parable that William Forster Lloyd published in 1833 to explain how individuals innocently acting in their own self interest can overexploit, and destroy, a resource that they all share. Lloyd described a simplified hypothetical situation based on medieval land tenure in Europe. Herders share common land on which they are each entitled to graze their cows. In Hardin's article, it is in each herder's individual interest to graze each new cow that the herder acquires on the common land, even if the carrying capacity of the common is exceeded, which damages the common for all the herders. The self-interested herder receives all of the benefits of having the additional cow, while all the herders share the damage to the common. However, all herders reach the same rational decision to buy additional cows and graze them on the common, which eventually destroys the common. Hardin concludes:
Therein is the tragedy. Each man is locked into a system that compels him to increase his herd without limit—in a world that is limited. Ruin is the destination toward which all men rush, each pursuing his own interest in a society that believes in the freedom of the commons. Freedom in a commons brings ruin to all.

In the course of his essay, Hardin develops the theme, drawing in many examples of latter day commons, such as national parks, the atmosphere, oceans, rivers and fish stocks. The example of fish stocks had led some to call this the "tragedy of the fishers". A major theme running through the essay is the growth of human populations, with the Earth's finite resources being the general common.

The tragedy of the commons has intellectual roots tracing back to Aristotle, who noted that "what is common to the greatest number has the least care bestowed upon it", as well as to Hobbes and his Leviathan. The opposite situation to a tragedy of the commons is sometimes referred to as a tragedy of the anticommons: a situation in which rational individuals, acting separately, collectively waste a given resource by underutilizing it.

The tragedy of the commons can be avoided if it is appropriately regulated. Hardin's use of "commons" has frequently been misunderstood, leading Hardin to later remark that he should have titled his work "The tragedy of the unregulated commons".

Sectors

Fisheries 

In wild fisheries, overexploitation or overfishing occurs when a fish stock has been fished down "below the size that, on average, would support the long-term maximum sustainable yield of the fishery". However, overexploitation can be sustainable.

When a fishery starts harvesting fish from a previously unexploited stock, the biomass of the fish stock will decrease, since harvesting means fish are being removed. For sustainability, the rate at which the fish replenish biomass through reproduction must balance the rate at which the fish are being harvested. If the harvest rate is increased, then the stock biomass will further decrease. At a certain point, the maximum harvest yield that can be sustained will be reached, and further attempts to increase the harvest rate will result in the collapse of the fishery. This point is called the maximum sustainable yield, and in practice, usually occurs when the fishery has been fished down to about 30% of the biomass it had before harvesting started.

It is possible to fish the stock down further to, say, 15% of the pre-harvest biomass, and then adjust the harvest rate so the biomass remains at that level. In this case, the fishery is sustainable, but is now overexploited, because the stock has been run down to the point where the sustainable yield is less than it could be.

Fish stocks are said to "collapse" if their biomass declines by more than 95 percent of their maximum historical biomass. Atlantic cod stocks were severely overexploited in the 1970s and 1980s, leading to their abrupt collapse in 1992. Even though fishing has ceased, the cod stocks have failed to recover. The absence of cod as the apex predator in many areas has led to trophic cascades.

About 25% of world fisheries are now overexploited to the point where their current biomass is less than the level that maximizes their sustainable yield. These depleted fisheries can often recover if fishing pressure is reduced until the stock biomass returns to the optimal biomass. At this point, harvesting can be resumed near the maximum sustainable yield.

The tragedy of the commons can be avoided within the context of fisheries if fishing effort and practices are regulated appropriately by fisheries management. One effective approach may be assigning some measure of ownership in the form of individual transferable quotas (ITQs) to fishermen. In 2008, a large scale study of fisheries that used ITQs, and ones that did not, provided strong evidence that ITQs help prevent collapses and restore fisheries that appear to be in decline.

Water resources 

Water resources, such as lakes and aquifers, are usually renewable resources which naturally recharge (the term fossil water is sometimes used to describe aquifers which do not recharge). Overexploitation occurs if a water resource, such as the Ogallala Aquifer, is mined or extracted at a rate that exceeds the recharge rate, that is, at a rate that exceeds the practical sustained yield. Recharge usually comes from area streams, rivers and lakes. An aquifer which has been overexploited is said to be overdrafted or depleted. Forests enhance the recharge of aquifers in some locales, although generally forests are a major source of aquifer depletion. Depleted aquifers can become polluted with contaminants such as nitrates, or permanently damaged through subsidence or through saline intrusion from the ocean.

This turns much of the world's underground water and lakes into finite resources with peak usage debates similar to oil. These debates usually centre around agriculture and suburban water usage but generation of electricity from nuclear energy or coal and tar sands mining is also water resource intensive. A modified Hubbert curve applies to any resource that can be harvested faster than it can be replaced. Though Hubbert's original analysis did not apply to renewable resources, their overexploitation can result in a Hubbert-like peak. This has led to the concept of peak water.

Forestry 

Forests are overexploited when they are logged at a rate faster than reforestation takes place. Reforestation competes with other land uses such as food production, livestock grazing, and living space for further economic growth. Historically utilization of forest products, including timber and fuel wood, have played a key role in human societies, comparable to the roles of water and cultivable land. Today, developed countries continue to utilize timber for building houses, and wood pulp for paper. In developing countries almost three billion people rely on wood for heating and cooking. Short-term economic gains made by conversion of forest to agriculture, or overexploitation of wood products, typically leads to loss of long-term income and long term biological productivity. West Africa, Madagascar, Southeast Asia and many other regions have experienced lower revenue because of overexploitation and the consequent declining timber harvests.

Biodiversity 

Overexploitation is one of the main threats to global biodiversity. Other threats include pollution, introduced and invasive species, habitat fragmentation, habitat destruction, uncontrolled hybridization, climate change, ocean acidification and the driver behind many of these, human overpopulation.

One of the key health issues associated with biodiversity is drug discovery and the availability of medicinal resources. A significant proportion of drugs are natural products derived, directly or indirectly, from biological sources. Marine ecosystems are of particular interest in this regard. However, unregulated and inappropriate bioprospecting could potentially lead to overexploitation, ecosystem degradation and loss of biodiversity.

Endangered and extinct species 

Species from all groups of fauna and flora are affected by overexploitation.

All living organisms require resources to survive. Overexploitation of these resources for protracted periods can deplete natural stocks to the point where they are unable to recover within a short time frame. Humans have always harvested food and other resources they have needed to survive. Human populations, historically, were small, and methods of collection limited to small quantities. With an exponential increase in human population, expanding markets and increasing demand, combined with improved access and techniques for capture, are causing the exploitation of many species beyond sustainable levels.  In practical terms, if continued, it reduces valuable resources to such low levels that their exploitation is no longer sustainable and can lead to the extinction of a species, in addition to having dramatic, unforeseen effects, on the ecosystem. Overexploitation often occurs rapidly as markets open, utilising previously untapped resources, or locally used species.

Today, overexploitation and misuse of natural resources is an ever-present threat for species richness. This is more prevalent when looking at island ecology and the species that inhabit them, as islands can be viewed as the world in miniature. Island endemic populations are more prone to extinction from overexploitation, as they often exist at low densities with reduced reproductive rates. A good example of this are island snails, such as the Hawaiian Achatinella and the French Polynesian Partula. Achatinelline snails have 15 species listed as extinct and 24 critically endangered while 60 species of partulidae are considered extinct with 14 listed as critically endangered. The WCMC have attributed over-collecting and very low lifetime fecundity for the extreme vulnerability exhibited among these species.

As another example, when the humble hedgehog was introduced to the Scottish island of Uist, the population greatly expanded and took to consuming and overexploiting shorebird eggs, with drastic consequences for their breeding success. Twelve species of avifauna are affected, with some species numbers being reduced by 39%.

Where there is substantial human migration, civil unrest, or war, controls may no longer exist. With civil unrest, for example in the Congo and Rwanda, firearms have become common and the breakdown of food distribution networks in such countries leaves the resources of the natural environment vulnerable. Animals are even killed as target practice, or simply to spite the government.  Populations of large primates, such as gorillas and chimpanzees, ungulates and other mammals, may be reduced by 80% or more by hunting, and certain species may be eliminated altogether. This decline has been called the bushmeat crisis.

Vertebrates 
Overexploitation threatens one-third of endangered vertebrates, as well as other groups. Excluding edible fish, the illegal trade in wildlife is valued at $10 billion per year.  Industries responsible for this include the trade in bushmeat, the trade in Chinese medicine, and the fur trade. The Convention for International Trade in Endangered Species of Wild Fauna and Flora, or CITES was set up in order to control and regulate the trade in endangered animals. It currently protects, to a varying degree, some 33,000 species of animals and plants. It is estimated that a quarter of the endangered vertebrates in the United States of America and half of the endangered mammals is attributed to overexploitation.

Birds 

Overall, 50 bird species that have become extinct since 1500 (approximately 40% of the total) have been subject to overexploitation, including:
 Great Auk – the penguin-like bird of the north, was hunted for its feathers, meat, fat and oil.
 Carolina parakeet – The only parrot species native to the eastern United States, was hunted for crop protection and its feathers.

Mammals 

 The international trade in fur: chinchilla, vicuña, giant otter and numerous cat species

Fish 

 Aquarium hobbyists: tropical fish

Various 
 Novelty pets: snakes, parrots, primates and big cats
 Chinese medicine: bears, tigers, rhinos, seahorses, Asian black bear and saiga antelope

Invertebrates 

 Insect collectors: butterflies
 Shell collectors: Marine molluscs

Plants 

 Horticulturists: New Zealand mistletoe (Trilepidea adamsii), orchids, cacti and many other plant species

Cascade effects 

Overexploitation of species can result in knock-on or cascade effects. This can particularly apply if, through overexploitation, a habitat loses its apex predator. Because of the loss of the top predator, a dramatic increase in their prey species can occur. In turn, the unchecked prey can then overexploit their own food resources until population numbers dwindle, possibly to the point of extinction.

A classic example of cascade effects occurred with sea otters. Starting before the 17th century and not phased out until 1911, sea otters were hunted aggressively for their exceptionally warm and valuable pelts, which could fetch up to $2500 US. This caused cascade effects through the kelp forest ecosystems along the Pacific Coast of North America.

One of the sea otters’ primary food sources is the sea urchin. When hunters caused sea otter populations to decline, an ecological release of sea urchin populations occurred. The sea urchins then overexploited their main food source, kelp, creating urchin barrens, areas of seabed denuded of kelp, but carpeted with urchins. No longer having food to eat, the sea urchin became locally extinct as well. Also, since kelp forest ecosystems are homes to many other species, the loss of the kelp caused other cascade effects of secondary extinctions.

In 1911, when only one small group of 32 sea otters survived in a remote cove, an international treaty was signed to prevent further exploitation of the sea otters. Under heavy protection, the otters multiplied and repopulated the depleted areas, which slowly recovered. More recently, with declining numbers of fish stocks, again due to overexploitation, killer whales have experienced a food shortage and have been observed feeding on sea otters, again reducing their numbers.

See also 

 Carrying capacity
 Common-pool resource
 Conservation biology
 Defaunation
 Deforestation
 Ecosystem management
 Exploitation of natural resources
 Extinction
 Human overpopulation
 Inverse commons
 Over-consumption
 Overpopulation in wild animals
 Paradox of enrichment
 Planetary boundaries
 Social dilemma
 Sustainability
 Tyranny of small decisions

References

Further reading 
 FAO (2005) Overcoming factors of unsustainability and overexploitation in fisheries Fisheries report 782, Rome. 
 We’ve overexploited the planet, now we need to change if we’re to survive. Patrick Vallance for The Guardian. July 8, 2022.

Ecology
Environmental conservation
Fisheries science
Environmental issues